Hugo Mikal Skår (born 27 October 1978) is a Norwegian actor.

Education 
Skår is a graduate of the Nordic Institute of Stage and Studio (NISS) in Oslo, where he spent three years in acting school. Skår has been studying method acting since 2006 to the tradition of Lee Strasberg.

Career 
Skår started as a production assistant in the film Monster Thursday (2003), then he got the role as Goddy in musical Fame (2004). Skår had attended acting school from 2005-08.

Skår worked at Regionteatret i Møre og Romsdal, better known as Teatret Vårt from 2008 until the end of 2010.
In spring 2008 Skår debuted in Sigurd Slembe and Arabian Nights for Teatret Vårt. Skår has also done roles in, among other things, Det regner aske, Presidentinnene and Invasion!, which was nominated for a Hedda Award in 2009. He also played the title role Othello which also got nominated for a Hedda Award. 
In 2011 startet to work in Rogaland Teater until 2014, then skår started work at Teatret Vårt until 2019.
In 2021 and 2022 skår will play in two movies.
In 2022 Hugo started working at Den Nationale Scene.

Theatre

Acting 

 2022: Come from Away
 2021: Othello
 2019: A Streetcar Named Desire
 2019: Death of a Salesman
 2018: Maraton dance
 2017: Kiss of the Spider Woman
 2016: Othello
 2015: The Curious Incident of the Dog in the Night-Time
 2014: The Black Rider
 2013: All's Well That Ends Well
 2013: Shoot/Get Treasure/Repeat
 2012: Oh My God
 2012: Festen
 2011: Sonny
 2010: Daniel 33
 2010: Hele norges bennus
 2010: Over ævne II
 2009: Taremareby
 2009: Presidentinnene
 2009: Cutting Torch
 2009: It's Raining Ash
 2008: Invasion
 2008: Sigurd Slembe
 2008: Arabian Nights
 2007: Festen
 2004: Fame

Film 
 2022: Troll
 2022: De Gjenvendte
 2012: Hotel Cæsar
 2008: The Whore
 2003: Monster Thursday

External links 
Instagram - hugoskaar

«Verdig avskjed», review of Daniel 33 in Romsdals Budstikke

Idalou.no
Idalou.no

1978 births
Living people
Norwegian male film actors
Norwegian male stage actors
Norwegian male musical theatre actors
People from Lisbon